Igubayevo (İgebay) is a rural locality (a village) in Ibrayevsky Selsoviet, Kugarchinsky District, Bashkortostan, Russia. The population was 172 as of 2010. There are 2 streets.

Geography 
Igubayevo is located 11 km northwest of Mrakovo (the district's administrative centre) by road. Ibrayevo is the nearest rural locality.

References 

Rural localities in Kugarchinsky District